The 1964 Kansas Jayhawks football team represented the University of Kansas in the 1964 NCAA University Division football season.

Regular season
During his Jayhawk career, Gale Sayers rushed for 2,675 yards and gained 3,917 all-purpose yards. In 1963, he set an NCAA Division I record with a 99-yard run against Nebraska. In his senior year, he led the Jayhawks to a 15–14 upset victory over Oklahoma with a 96-yard kickoff return.

Schedule

Roster

Game summaries

vs. TCU

at Syracuse

vs. Wyoming

at Iowa State

vs. Oklahoma

at Oklahoma State

at Kansas State

vs. Nebraska

vs. Colorado

at Missouri

Awards and honors
Gale Sayers – Consensus All-America selection, All-Big Eight

1965 NFL Draft

Gale Sayers was also drafted by the Kansas City Chiefs in the first round of the 1965 American Football League draft.

References

Kansas
Kansas Jayhawks football seasons
Kansas Jayhawks football